Maharashtra Shahir is an upcoming Indian Marathi-language biographical film based on Shahir Sable, a
Maharashtrian singer, playwright, performer and folk theatre producer and director. It is directed by Kedar shinde and produced by Bela Shinde. It is scheduled to be theatrically released on 28 April 2023.

Synopsis 
The biopic is set to chronicle the life and times of the legendary Shahir Sable, an iconic figure in the Marathi music industry.

Cast 

 Ankush Chaudhari as Shahir Sable 
 Ankush Prashant More as Devdatta Sable 
 Parinita Dilip Ghone as Shejarin
 Sana Kedar Shinde as Bhanumati Sable
 Swapnil Parjanel as young Vasant 
 Harish  Baraskar as Ganpatrao

Production

Filming 
The shooting of the film began on the auspicious day of Vijayadashami on 5 October 2022 at Krishnarao Sable's village Wai. Jadhav chose the hills of Satara for the shoot, including Pasrani Ghat.

Soundtrack

Release 
The film is scheduled to be theatrically released on 28 April 2023.The movie poster unevils on 16 Feb 2023 with CM Eknath Shinde & Kalyan loksabha MP Dr. Shrikant Shinde at official residence of CM Bungalow.

References

External links  

 

2023 films
Indian films based on actual events
Indian biographical films